Gongneung Station is a station on the Seoul Subway Line 7, also known as "Seoul National University of Science and Technology Station".

There are four exits, one at each corner of the crossroads just above the station. No escalators are built on any of the exits yet, but a lift for the disabled is installed near the exit #2. Seoul National University of Science and Technology is located within a distance of 10 minute walk from the station.

Station layout

Metro stations in Nowon District
Seoul Metropolitan Subway stations
Railway stations opened in 1996